Vernham Dean, sometimes known as Vernhams Dean, is a village and civil parish in the Test Valley district of Hampshire, England, just east of the Wiltshire border and south of the Berkshire border.

It is bounded by the civil parishes of Buttermere, Combe, Linkenholt, Hurstbourne Tarrant, Tangley, Chute, and Tidcombe and Fosbury.

In the village there is The George pub and the Millennium Hall which is used for a variety of community events and services and for private hire. The village is served by the Vernham Dean Gillum's Church of England Primary School and the Little Fingers Pre-school.

There is a legend that Chute Causeway is haunted by a guilt-ridden pastor of Vernham Dean who left his villagers to die of the Black Death in 1665.

References

External links
 
 Village website

Villages in Hampshire
Civil parishes in Hampshire
Test Valley